Axonophora is an extinct suborder of graptolites. It primarily consists of the biserial graptolites, and also includes the retiolitids and monograptids.

Taxonomy
Taxonomy of Axonophora from Maletz (2014):

Infraorder †Diplograptina Lapworth, 1880e
Family †Diplograptidae Lapworth, 1873b
Subfamily †Diplograptinae Lapworth, 1873b
Subfamily †Orthograptinae Mitchell, 1987
Family †Lasiograptidae Lapworth, 1880e
Family †Climacograptidae Frech, 1897
Family †Dicranograptidae Lapworth, 1873b
Subfamily †Dicranograptinae Lapworth, 1873b
Subfamily †Nemagraptinae Lapworth, 1873
Infraorder †Neograptina Štorch et al., 2011
(Unranked)
Family †Normalograptidae Štorch & Serpagli, 1993
Family †Neodiplograptidae Melchin et al., 2011
Subfamily †Neodiplograptinae Melchin et al. 2011
Subfamily †Petalolithinae Bulman, 1955
Superfamily †Retiolitoidea Lapworth, 1873b
Family †Retiolitidae Lapworth, 1873b (retiolitids)
Subfamily †Retiolitinae Lapworth, 1873
Subfamily †Plectograptinae Bouček & Münch, 1952
Superfamily †Monograptoidea Lapworth, 1873
Family †Dimorphograptidae Elles & Wood, 1908
Family †Monograptidae Lapworth, 1873b (monograptids; possibly several subfamilies)

References

Graptolites
Prehistoric hemichordates
Animal suborders